Outward Bound USA (OBUSA) is a non-profit organization providing experiential education in the United States through a network of regional schools, especially in wilderness settings. Outward Bound counts among its desired outcomes the development of self-awareness, self-confidence, leadership skills, environmental and social responsibility.

History 

Like other Outward Bound International member organizations, Outward Bound USA's course offerings are derived from the work of German educator Kurt Hahn and his Outward Bound schools co-founded with Lawrence Holt in the United Kingdom in 1941.

The first course in the United States was run in 1961 for the Peace Corps, which it helped to shape.

Outward Bound schools 

 Chesapeake Bay Outward Bound School
 Colorado Outward Bound School
 Hurricane Island Outward Bound School
 North Carolina Outward Bound School
 Northwest Outward Bound School
 Outward Bound California
 Philadelphia Outward Bound School
 Thompson Island Outward Bound Education Center
 Voyageur Outward Bound School
 New York City Outward Bound Schools
 Omaha Outward Bound

Outward Bound courses

OBUSA offers a range of courses targeted at different ages and interests. Students are required to work together to complete outdoor education activities including rock climbing, backpacking, navigation, canoeing, mountaineering, and sailing.

 classic: expeditions in the wilderness, usually lasting 15 days, separated by age groups (middle school, high school, and adult)
 classic family: expeditions for family groups
 semester: lasting 30 to 85 days, these expeditions are intended for students of college age
 outdoor educator: for training and certification of wilderness education instructors
 intercept: for teens having difficulties at home or in school and their families
 veterans: offered at no cost to returned service members, lasting five to seven days
 professional: of varying length, these combine outdoor and indoor education for organizations, companies, and non-profits
 grieving teens: places young people who have experienced loss in a wilderness setting with others who have had similar experiences
 group: customized courses for high school and college groups, or groups such as cancer survivors
 educator: provide teachers with ways to integrate the Outward Bound approach into their work with students

Diversity training
In the United States, Outward Bound schools have employed "diversity trainings" for their staff in order to prepare instructors to address the various issues that may arise on course due to a diverse group of participants. Diversity trainings are intended to provide the arena where staff can be challenged in the same ways participants are challenged to step out of their comfort zone. Outward Bound programs continue to focus on enriching the lives of students from all walks of life, and strive to empower their staff in awareness of issues that arise in groups.

TV series
A television series aired on Discovery Kids from 1999 to 2003. In each location, the show followed a group of eight young adults as they learned to work together and help each other survive in the wilderness. Under the guidance of instructors from the Outward Bound school, the group members struggled to cope with nature and each other, with success and failure, with physical and mental challenges, and ultimately bonded together as a result of the experience.

EL Education and Outward Bound
A non-profit comprehensive school reform organization which is no longer a part of Outward Bound USA, EL Education works with over 150 urban and rural schools across the United States including Puerto Rico.

References

External links

Outward Bound
Putnam County, New York
Discovery Kids original programming
1990s American documentary television series
2000s American documentary television series
1999 American television series debuts
2003 American television series endings
American educational television series
Non-profit organizations based in New York (state)